Răzvan Constantin Martin (born 22 December 1991) is a Romanian weightlifter. He competed at the 2008 and 2012 Olympics and won a bronze medal in 2012.

On 25 November 2020, the reanalysed doping tests from the 2012 Summer Olympics turned out positive for dehydrochlormethyltestosterone, metenolone and stanozolol, and he was stripped of his medal.

In the 2012 European Championships, he originally won a silver in the −77 kg division, but was later awarded the gold medal because Erkand Qerimaj was banned for doping use. In 2013 Martin himself was suspended for doping violations.

References

1991 births
Living people
Romanian male weightlifters
Olympic weightlifters of Romania
Weightlifters at the 2008 Summer Olympics
Weightlifters at the 2012 Summer Olympics
Sportspeople from Cluj-Napoca
Doping cases in weightlifting
Romanian sportspeople in doping cases
European Weightlifting Championships medalists
Competitors stripped of Summer Olympics medals
20th-century Romanian people
21st-century Romanian people